George Albert Boulenger  (19 October 1858 – 23 November 1937) was a Belgian-British zoologist who described and gave scientific names to over 2,000 new animal species, chiefly fish, reptiles, and amphibians. Boulenger was also an active botanist during the last 30 years of his life, especially in the study of roses.

Life
Boulenger was born in Brussels, Belgium, the only son of Gustave Boulenger, a Belgian public notary, and Juliette Piérart, from Valenciennes. He graduated in 1876 from the Free University of Brussels with a degree in natural sciences, and worked for a while at the Royal Belgian Institute of Natural Sciences, Brussels, as an assistant naturalist studying amphibians, reptiles, and fishes.  He also made frequent visits during this time to the Muséum national d'Histoire naturelle in Paris and the British Museum in London.

In 1880, he was invited to work at the Natural History Museum, then a department of the British Museum, by Dr. Albert C. L. G. Günther and assigned to the task of cataloguing the amphibians in the collection.  His position in the British Museum meant that he had to be a civil servant of the British Empire, so became a naturalized British subject.  In 1882, he became a first-class assistant in the Department of Zoology and remained in that position until his retirement in 1920.

After his retirement from the British Museum, Boulenger studied roses and published 34 papers on botanical subjects and two volumes on the roses of Europe.  He died in Saint Malo, France.

According to biographical accounts, he was incredibly methodical and had an amazing memory that enabled him to remember every specimen and scientific name he ever saw.  He also had extraordinary powers of writing, seldom made a second draft of anything he wrote, and his manuscripts showed but few corrections before going to the publisher.

Boulenger also played the violin, could speak French, German, and English apart from reading Spanish, Italian and a bit of Russian.  As a zoologist, he also had a working knowledge of both Greek and Latin.

By 1921, Boulenger had published 875 papers totaling more than 5,000 pages, as well as 19 monographs on fishes, amphibians, and reptiles.  The list of his publications and its index of species covers 77 printed pages.

He described 1,096 species of fish, 556 species of amphibians, and 872 species of reptiles.  He was famous for his monographs on amphibians, lizards and other reptiles, and fishes for example his monographs on the fishes of Africa.

He was a member of the American Society of Ichthyologists and Herpetologists and was elected its first honorary member in 1935. In 1937, Belgium conferred on him the Order of Leopold, the highest honor awarded to a civilian.

His son, Edward George Boulenger (1888–1946), was also a zoologist and held the post of Director of the London Zoo Aquarium.

Work on cave-dwelling fish
In 1897, King Leopold II of Belgium started to recruit naturalists to help create the Congo museum.  Boulenger was named chairman for this commission.

His main discovery in 1921 was a strange fish from the Congo.  It was eyeless and lacked pigmentation. He recognized it as new and unrelated to any extant epigean (eyed, surface) species of Africa. He wrote a brief paper describing this new species of cave fish, the first ever described from Africa.  He called it Caecobarbus geertsii, from caeco = blind, barbus = barb, and geertsii, honoring a mysterious person, M. Geerts, who provided him with the specimen.  Today, it is known as the Congo or African blind barb.

Honours
1912: Member of the Royal Academy of Science, Letters and Fine Arts of Belgium.

Species

Boulenger described hundreds of reptile taxa; 587 species described by him are still recognised today. He also described many amphibians and fishes.

These 26 reptile species, recognised today, bear George Boulenger's name in the specific name, as boulengeri, boulengerianus, boulengerii, or georgeboulengeri :

Agama boulengeri  – Boulenger's agama
Anolis boulengerianus  – Tehuantepec anole
Atractaspis boulengeri  – Boulenger's burrowing asp

Atractus boulengerii  – Boulenger's centipede snake
Brachymeles boulengeri  – Boulenger's short-legged skink
Chalcides boulengeri  – Boulenger's sand skink
Cnemaspis boulengerii  – Con Dao rock gecko
Compsophis boulengeri  – Boulenger's forest snake
Cylindrophis boulengeri  – Timor pipesnake
Dendragama boulengeri  – Boulenger's tree agama
Elapsoidea boulengeri  – Boulenger's gartersnake
Feylinia boulengeri  – gabon legless skink 
Hebius boulengeri  – Tai-Yong keelback
Enyalius boulengeri  – Brazilian fathead anole
Epacrophis boulengeri  – Lamu blindsnake
Gonyosoma boulengeri  – rhinoceros ratsnake
Chersobius boulengeri  – Karoo padloper
Liolaemus boulengeri  – Boulenger's tree lizard
Morethia boulengeri  – Boulenger's snake-eyed skink
Nucras boulengeri  – Ugandan savanna lizard
Pareas boulengeri  – Boulenger's slug snake
Xenoxybelis boulengeri  – southern sharp-nosed snake
Rhampholeon boulengeri  – Boulenger's pygmy chameleon
Scolecoseps boulengeri  – Moçambique legless skink
Trachyboa boulengeri  – northern eyelash boa
Trachylepis boulengeri  – Boulenger's skink

In the above list, a binomial authority in parentheses indicates that the species was originally described in a genus other than the genus to which it is currently assigned.

The water cobra genus Boulengerina  was named for G.A. Boulenger, but it is now treated as a subgenus of Naja  containing four species: Naja annulata  (water cobra), Naja christyi  (Congo water cobra), Naja melanoleuca  (forest cobra), and Naja multifasciata  (burrowing cobra).

Fish species named after Boulenger

The catfish Heterobranchus boulengeri Pellegrin
Hyphessobrycon boulengeri (Eigenmann, 1907)
Lepidiolamprologus boulengeri (Steindachner, 1909)
Xenophysogobio boulengeri (T. L. Tchang, 1929) was named for Boulenger, who provided "some guidance" (translation) in the completion of Tchang's paper.

Botany

Bibliography
He contributed a monograph published in volume 7 of The Cambridge Natural History.
Books written by George Albert Boulenger include:
Catalogue of the Batrachia Salientia s. Ecaudata in the Collection of the British Museum. (1882).
Catalogue of the Lizards in the British Museum (Natural History). Second Edition. (1885, 1885, 1887). Three volumes. 
Catalogue of the Chelonians, Rhynchocephalians, and Crocodiles in the British Museum (Natural History). New Edition. (1889). 
The Fauna of British India, Including Ceylon and Burma. Reptilia and Batrachia. (1890).
Catalogue of the Snakes in the British Museum (Natural History). (1893, 1894, 1896). Three volumes.
The Tailless Batrachians of Europe. (1897).
The Snakes of Europe. (1913).

References

External links

Boulenger GA (1890). The Fauna of British India. Including Ceylon and Burma. Reptilia and Batrachia. London: Secretary of State for India in Council. (Taylor and Francis, printers). xviii + 541 pp. Scanned version.
List of reptiles described by Boulenger in the Reptile Database

19th-century Belgian zoologists
1858 births
1937 deaths
20th-century Belgian botanists
British herpetologists
British ichthyologists
Fellows of the Royal Society
Employees of the Natural History Museum, London
Members of the Royal Academy of Belgium
20th-century British zoologists
Belgian herpetologists